At Home with GMA Regional TV  is a 2020 Philippine television news broadcasting show broadcast by GMA Davao and GMA Cagayan de Oro. Originally hosted by Rgil Relator, Cyril Chaves and Atty. Resci Rizada, it premiered on June 1, 2020, on the network's morning lineup every Monday to Friday from 8:00 AM to 8:25 AM. Jandi Esteban, Cyril Chaves, Abbey Caballero and Krissa Dapitan currently serve as the hosts.

Overview
The show is the first and only unified morning show in Mindanao. It premiered on GMA Davao (Channel 5) and GMA Cagayan de Oro (Channel 35) on 1 June 2020 and is simulcast over TV-4 Dipolog, TV-3 Pagadian, TV-11 Iligan, TV-12 Bukidnon, TV-5 Ozamiz, TV-26 Butuan, TV-10 Surigao, TV-2 Tandag, TV-12 Kidapawan, TV-8 General Santos, TV-12 Cotabato, TV-9 Zamboanga and TV-12 Jolo.

It marked the return of GMA Davao's return on producing morning news programs five years after its predecessor Una Ka BAI went off the air following the strategic streamlining of programs and manpower in its provincial stations. At Home with GMA Regional TV boasts of segments that highlight positive features and stories of people in the entire island of Mindanao.

Starting February 6, 2023, the program shifted from a pre-recorded presentation to a live coverage as part of the rebranding of GMA Regional TV, integrating news reports alongside interviews with personalities all over Mindanao. Co-hosts and news producers Abbey Caballero and Krissa Dapitan  joined the show as part of this change.

Segments
 Unang Balita
 Bantay Presyo
 BizTalk
 Spotlight
 GMA Integrated News Weather Center
 Kumbira
 Panultihon
  At Home with GMA Regional TV (segment on One Mindanao)

Hosts
Current
 Cyril Chaves  - Main Host
 Jandi Esteban  - Co-Host 
 Krissa Marie Dapitan  - Co-Host
 Abbey Caballero  - Co-Host

Former
 Rgil Relator 
 Atty. Resci Rizada 
 Jestoni Jumamil 
 Efren Mamac

References

External links
 

2020 Philippine television series debuts
GMA Network news shows
GMA Integrated News and Public Affairs shows
Philippine television news shows
Television in Davao City